Poison the Parish is the seventh studio album by South African rock band Seether. It was released on 12 May 2017. It is the band's first album to feature a new band logo on the cover. The first single, "Let You Down" was released on 23 February 2017. On 23 March 2017, the band released a new track titled "Stoke the Fire". On 13 April 2017, "Nothing Left" was released. On 5 May 2017, "Count Me Out" was released. On 9 August 2017, the album's second single, "Betray and Degrade" was released. On 8 April 2018, the album's third single, "Against the Wall", was released.

Themes and composition
In response to being asked about the album's "heavier" direction than prior releases, frontman Shaun Morgan said of the album's musical direction:

He further expanded that the album's emphasis would be on "heavy guitars" and "loud drums", but not "...a lot of percussion in the background and keyboard parts and tons of strings in different places. There's a time and place for all those things, but I didn't feel like this was that time or place."

Reception

The album was generally well received, with critics praising the album's quality despite a perceived lack of originality. AllMusic was generally positive about the album, concluding that "Poison the Parish doesn't deviate too far from the structural blueprints of prior outings, but it's hardly the work of a band just going through the motions. By attaining autonomy, Seether seems to have rediscovered their vitality." Similarly, Team Rock felt that the album was "a competent radio rock record that's a little too long and ends on a mediocre ballad. It won't be the last album of 2017 to fit that description, but it will likely be one of the better ones."

Track listing

Personnel
Credits adapted from the album's liner notes.

Seether
Shaun Morgan – lead vocals, guitar
Dale Stewart – bass, backing vocals
John Humphrey – drums, percussion

Production
Shaun Morgan – producer
Matt Hyde – engineer, mixing
Jordan Griffin – assistant engineer
Sean Badum – assistant engineer
Tom Baker – mastering

Charts

References

2017 albums
Seether albums